Monmouth Comprehensive School is a comprehensive secondary school for pupils aged 11–18, situated in Monmouth, Monmouthshire, Wales.

History
The school was established in 1903 when it was known as William Jones Elementary School. This sandstone building is at the west end of the site and was built for the Haberdashers Company. This was  probably designed by Henry Stock.  New buildings were built at the end of the war in what has been described as an undemonstrative style. In September 1947 it became the Monmouth Secondary Modern School, before changing to its current name in September 1977. At that time further classroom blocks were built at the north east end of the site.  The school has Monmouth Leisure Centre in its grounds.

Description
Currently the school has approximately 1700 students and offers a broad and balanced knowledge-rich curriculum across all Key Stages. The school runs an extensive and diverse programme of curriculum enrichment activities and after school clubs, especially in music, drama, science, cookery and physical education.

Welsh
The school teaches Welsh as the subject has been compulsory in Wales since the Welsh Language Act of 1993. However, in 2009 there were still students being sent to John Kyrle High School in Ross-on-Wye, England where the Act does not apply. At the same time another bus brought children from Ross to the school where they would learn Welsh.

Previous headteachers

Outside the classroom

Sport

Monmouth Leisure Centre is within the grounds of the school and this has a swimming pool, squash courts and space for indoor and outdoor sports.  The school is well represented at all age groups in sports including rugby (both league and union), football, hockey, cricket, and netball.  The Year 11 rugby league team were crowned Carnegie Schools Welsh champions. Many students represent the county and national teams.  The school has been recognised for sporting achievement.  Three students were chosen as Olympic Ambassadors and two were Olympic Torch bearers in 2012.

Rowing

The school runs the Monmouth Comprehensive School Boat Club which is affiliated to British Rowing (boat code MOC). It is the only fully comprehensive school rowing club in England and Wales.

Many students compete in national championships with some gaining international recognition. At the British Rowing Championships the women's J16 single scull won the national title in 2013 and the Open J16 quad scull crew won the national title in 2017.

Extra curricular clubs and academies
Monmouth Comprehensive School runs a range of after school clubs and academies aimed at providing students with an opportunity for extended learning. These activities are designed to supplement the curriculum and enable students to learn to lead their lives through exploring what motivates them and what they enjoy. Clubs include Japanese, equine academy, fencing, cookery and many more.

Eco-Schools
Monmouth Comprehensive School is striving to become a more eco-friendly school; the Eco-Council is about to apply for their second green flag.   The Eco-Schools Committee is an established forum of pupils of all ages, who are trying to improve the environmental aspects of everyday life in Monmouth. It is based around the philosophy of "Learning To Care For Our World".  In 2012, the school held a successful Green Week which helped raise awareness of Fairtrade and recycling. Activities that were undertaken included a paper mountain to raise awareness of how much paper is used within the school, an ecotree, a logo competition and many more, all designed to raise awareness of environmental issues within the school.
There are plans to fill a time capsule which will be buried under the Jubilee Oak tree that the school will be receiving soon.  This will give students of the future a chance to see what the school was like in 2012. In addition to this, the school already has an established recycling policy and an effective litter management system.

References

External links 
School website (newly online Jan 2013)

Buildings and structures in Monmouth, Wales
Secondary schools in Monmouthshire